Panther Mountain is a mountain in Banff National Park, Alberta, Canada.

The mountain was named in 1884 by George M. Dawson after learning that the local Indians referred to a river below the peak as "The river where the mountain lion was killed".

References

Two-thousanders of Alberta
Mountains of Banff National Park